Paula Herrera (born 11 March 1987) is a road cyclist from Costa Rica. She became  Costa Rican national road race champion in 2014.

References

External links
 profile at Procyclingstats.com

1987 births
Costa Rican female cyclists
Living people
Place of birth missing (living people)
21st-century Costa Rican women